Andreas Leitner (born 25 March 1994) is an Austrian professional footballer who plays as a goalkeeper for Liga I club Petrolul Ploiești.

Club career
From 2011 to 2022, Leitner played for Admira Wacker. During the 2015-16 season, he was sent on loan to Austria Klagenfurt.

On 14 September 2022, after 11 years at Admira Wacker, Leitner moved abroad for the first time by agreeing to a two-year deal with Romanian club Petrolul Ploiești.

Honours 
Admira Wacker
 ÖFB Cup runner-up: 2015–16

References

External links
 
 Andreas Leitner at OEFB

1994 births
Living people
People from Leoben
Austrian footballers
Footballers from Styria
Association football goalkeepers
Austria youth international footballers
Austria under-21 international footballers
Austrian Football Bundesliga players
2. Liga (Austria) players
Liga I players
FC Admira Wacker Mödling players
SK Austria Klagenfurt players
FC Petrolul Ploiești players
Austrian expatriate footballers
Expatriate footballers in Romania
Austrian expatriate sportspeople in Romania